Jameson's antpecker (Parmoptila jamesoni) is a songbird species found in central Africa. Like all antpeckers, it is tentatively placed in the estrildid finch family (Estrildidae). It has traditionally been included as a subspecies of P. rubrifrons (red-fronted antpecker) and the common name Jameson's antpecker was sometimes used for both taxa. But today, they are often considered distinct species.

Jameson's antpecker inhabits tropical lowland moist forest in Uganda, Tanzania and the Democratic Republic of the Congo. When Jameson's and the red-fronted antpeckers were still evaluated as one species, they were classified as a species of least concern by the IUCN. Unlike its western relative which is declining noticeably, P. jamesoni is still common and widespread. Therefore, its status has not changed after its elevation to a full species. 

Jameson's antpecker is named after James Sligo Jameson. Given Jameson's violent behavior  in Africa ornithologists have suggested changing the common name of this species.

Footnotes

References
 BirdLife International (BLI) (2008) Jameson's Antpecker Species Factsheet. Retrieved 26 May 2008

Jameson's antpecker
Birds of Central Africa
Jameson's antpecker
Jameson's antpecker